Abdelhakim Zouita (born 12 August 1986) is a Moroccan professional basketball player who currently plays for AS Salé of the Moroccan First Division.

International career 
Zouita was named to the 15-man Morocco preliminary squad for the AfroBasket 2015.

References

External links 
FIBA.com profile
Abdelhakim Zouita at RealGM
Abdelhakim Zouita at Afrobasket.com

Living people
1986 births
Moroccan men's basketball players
People from Kenitra
Power forwards (basketball)
Small forwards
AS Salé (basketball) players